The Yucatán Symphony Orchestra ( – OSY) is an orchestra based in Mérida, Yucatán, México.

History
The OSY was founded February 2004 in Mérida, Yucatán thru a joint venture by Yucatán State Government and the Orquesta Sinfónica de Yucatán foundation. Its main performing venue is the Peón Contreras theater in Mérida.

The OSY has a new organization, FIGAROSY (Fideicomiso Garante de la Orquestra Sinfonica de Yucatán) working closely with the Patronato para la Orquestra Sinfónica de Yucatán, a private group of patrons who support, raise money for and work closely with the orchestra.

The OSY is in its Season XII with maestro Juan Carlos Lomonaco as Music Director and Conductor.

Conductors
 Juan Felipe Molano Muñoz (2004–2007)
 José Luis Chan Sabido (2008)
 Juan Carlos Lomónaco (2009– )

Profile
65 base musicians:
 10 First violins
 10 Second violins
 8 Violas
 6 Violoncellos
 4 Bass
 3 Flutes
 3 Oboes
 3 Clarinets
 3 Bassoonists
 4 Horns
 3 Trumpets
 3 Trombones
 1 Tuba
 1 Harp
 3 Percussionists

External links
 Orquesta Sinfónica de Yucatán. Sitio de la Orquesta Sinfónica de Yucatán.
 Patronato de la Orquesta Sinfónica de Yucatán. Sitio del Patronato de la Orquesta Sinfónica de Yucatán.
 Juan Carlos Lomónaco web site http://www.juancarloslomonaco.com
 Programa de la OSY para 2009

References

Mexican orchestras
Musical groups established in 2004